Consort Song may refer to:

Consort song, English song form of the late 16th and early 17th centuries

People
Empress Jingyin (died 82), concubine of Emperor Zhang of Han
Empress Song (Han dynasty) (died 178), wife of Emperor Ling of Han
Song Fujin (died 945), wife of Li Bian (Emperor Liezu of Southern Tang)
Empress Song (Song dynasty) (952–995), wife of Emperor Taizu 
Queen Jeongsun (Danjong) (1440–1521), wife of Danjong of Joseon
Concubine Mao (1677–1730), concubine of the Yongzheng Emperor